Robinson Reinaldo Merchán Useche (born 28 October 1964) is a male professional road racing cyclist from Venezuela. He competed in the individual road race at the 1992 Summer Olympics.

Career

1990
7th in General Classification Tour of the Americas, Carolina (USA)
1991
 in Pan American Games, Road, Havana (CUB)
1994
1st in General Classification Vuelta Internacional al Estado Trujillo (VEN)
1998
1st in General Classification Vuelta a la Independencia Nacional (DOM)
1st in Stage 6 Vuelta al Táchira, Palmira (VEN)
3rd in General Classification Vuelta al Táchira (VEN)
1999
4th in General Classification Vuelta a Venezuela (VEN)
2000
1st in Stage 9 Vuelta a Cuba, Santa Clara (CUB)
2002
1st in Clasico Ciudad de Valencia (VEN)

References

External links
 

1964 births
Living people
Venezuelan male cyclists
Vuelta a Venezuela stage winners
Tour de Guadeloupe winners
Cyclists at the 1991 Pan American Games
Cyclists at the 1992 Summer Olympics
Olympic cyclists of Venezuela
People from Caracas
Pan American Games medalists in cycling
Pan American Games gold medalists for Venezuela
Medalists at the 1991 Pan American Games
20th-century Venezuelan people
21st-century Venezuelan people